Charak Palika Hospital a government hospital maintained by the New Delhi Municipal Council.

Medical facilities 

 Cardiology / Medicine and ECHO
 Surgery
 ENT including audiology
 Paediatrics
 Eye
 Physiotherapy
 Radiology and Ultrasound facilities
 Psychiatry
 Orthopedics
 Dental

References 

Hospitals in Delhi
Hospitals established in 1973
New Delhi